The 2014 Arkansas Razorbacks football team represented the University of Arkansas during the 2014 NCAA Division I FBS football season. The Razorbacks played their home games at Donald W. Reynolds Razorback Stadium in Fayetteville and War Memorial Stadium in Little Rock. They competed as a member of the Western Division of the Southeastern Conference. They were led by second year head coach Bret Bielema. They finished the season 7–6, 2–6 in SEC play to finish in last place in the Western Division. They were invited to the Texas Bowl where they defeated Texas.

Personnel

Coaching staff

Schedule

Schedule Source:

Game summaries

at No. 6 Auburn

Nicholls State

With the 73–7 victory over the Colonels, the Razorbacks managed to end their 10-game losing streak, the longest in school history. Arkansas scored 63 unanswered points before Nicholls State scored a touchdown in the third quarter. The 73 points scored are tied for the third most in school history.

at Texas Tech

The win against the Red Raiders gave Arkansas their first back-to-back wins since September 2013. The Razorbacks had 31 first downs during the game, only punting the ball once, while racking up 438 rushing yards on 68 carries.

Northern Illinois

The Razorbacks got their first score of the game when Korliss Marshall returned the opening kick 97 yards for a touchdown; this was the first time since 2009 vs Missouri State that Arkansas returned the opening kick for a touchdown. Unfortunately, Marshall would be dismissed from the team later in the season. With the win, Arkansas had outscored their previous three opponents 174-49.

at No. 6 Texas A&M

The Aggies scored a touchdown and extra point in the first minute of the game, but the Razorbacks quickly overtook them, maintaining a lead that was not broken until the Aggies scored in overtime. The Aggies lagged for much of the game but came back in the final quarter, sending the game into overtime tied at 28. The Aggies won the coin toss and quickly threw a 25-yard touchdown and converted the extra point. The Razorbacks were unable to convert a first down and lost 35-28.

vs No. 7 Alabama

vs No. 10 Georgia

vs UAB

at No. 1 Mississippi State

vs. No. 20 LSU

This was the first win in SEC play since October 13, 2012, when the Razorbacks beat Kentucky 49-7 and their first win over LSU since 2010. It was the first time Arkansas shut out LSU in a conference game. The Hogs also took home the Golden Boot, a trophy which goes to the winner of each game and remains at that school until the following years contest.

vs. No. 8 Ole Miss

Arkansas dominated the Rebels in this matchup as they became the first unranked team ever to shut out two ranked opponents in consecutive games, and got bowl eligible for the first time since 2011.

at No. 17 Missouri

In the first annual "Battle Line Rivalry" game between these two schools, Missouri overcame an Arkansas lead in the fourth quarter to win this inaugural contest.

vs. Texas–Texas Bowl

This matchup of former Southwest Conference rivals was only the fifth time the Hogs and Horns have met since Arkansas left the old SWC following the 1991 season. The Razorbacks beat Texas in the 2000 Cotton Bowl, and in 2003 in Austin. The Longhorns defeated Arkansas in Fayetteville in 2004, and in Austin in 2008. 
Texas is coached by native-Arkansan Charlie Strong.

References

Arkansas
Arkansas Razorbacks football seasons
Texas Bowl champion seasons
Arkansas Razorbacks football